Cheris Salano Avilia (born 11 December 1989), known as Cheris Salano, is a Kenyan footballer who plays for Spedag and the Kenya national team.

She played for Kenya at the 2016 Africa Women Cup of Nations, scoring for Kenya in the match against Mali.

See also
List of Kenya women's international footballers

References

1989 births
Living people
Kenyan women's footballers
Women's association football midfielders
Kenya women's international footballers